Nijiayan Station is an underground metro station in Ningbo, Zhejiang, China. Nijiayan Station situates on Hudong Road, Near Rihu Park. Construction of the station started in December 2010 and the station opened to service on September 26, 2015.

Exits 
Nijiayan Station has 3 exits.

References 

Railway stations in Zhejiang
Railway stations in China opened in 2015
Ningbo Rail Transit stations